Hogenskild Bielke (1538 – 3 June 1605) was a Swedish baron, court official and riksråd. He was one of the more prominent leaders of the Swedish nobility in their power struggle against royal authority during the 16th-century.

Life
He was the son of riksråd Nils Pedersson of Åkerö and Anna Hogenskild of Hedensö. In 1569 married Anna Sture (1541-1595), daughter of Svante Stensson Sture and Martha Leijonhufvud and thus niece of queen Margaret Leijonhufvud.

He was raised at court, his mother being a lady-in-waiting, and became the playmate of prince Magnus, Duke of Östergötland and courtier of king Gustav I of Sweden in 1556. He was made member of the royal council by Eric XIV of Sweden and served as a military commander in the Northern Seven Years' War.

In the autumn of 1573, the Mornay plot was prepared to assassinate John III.  The plot was led by Charles de Mornay, who was in contact with Christina of Denmark and the French ambassador in Copenhagen Charles Dancay. John III was to be killed during a swords dance performed by Scottish mercenaries at the party which was to be given in October that year before the Scottish mercenaries departure to the Baltic, and the king's brother Duke Charles was to be placed upon the throne. The plot did not materialize as de Mornay lost his nerve and never gave the sign to the mercenaries to take action. In September 1574, the plot was revealed and Charles de Mornay was arrested, interrogated and executed.  It was never made clear who participated in the plot, but it was noted that the suspected conspirators Hogenskild Bielke, Gustaf Banér and Pontus De la Gardie often gathered at meetings in the apartment of Princess Elizabeth of Sweden with Princess Cecilia of Sweden, and Charles de Mornay claimed that one of the things which were agreed upon by the conspirators was to raise the dowry of Elizabeth from 100,000 to 150,000, so to make it possible for her to make a marriage of higher status, which would refer to the suggested marriage between Elizabeth and Henry III of France, in which the French ambassador had expressed himself impressed by everything regarding Elizabeth with the exception of her dowry. The two royal sisters and their brother Charles were somewhat compromised, though neither they, Bielke, Banér or De la Gardie was openly accused of their suspected involvement.

When the king and queen visited their son Sigismund III Wasa in Reval in 1589, he and Axel Bielke was appointed to serve as regent during their absence. He was described as clever and skillful and worked to increase the power of nobility against the crown.  He sided with Sigimund III against Duke Charles. His son Svante fled to Denmark after the War against Sigismund to avoid execution. Hogenskild was tried during the Linköping Bloodbath in 1600, but was imprisoned rather than executed. In 1605, however, he was found to have been involved in a correspondence judged as treasonable alongside his daughter Ebba Bielke. He was executed for treason in Stockholm.

References

 Bielke, Hogenskild Nilsson i Herman Hofberg, Svenskt biografiskt handlexikon (andra upplagan, 1906)

1538 births
1605 deaths
Members of the Privy Council of Sweden
16th-century Swedish politicians
16th-century Swedish military personnel
16th-century executions by Sweden
People executed for treason against Sweden
People of the Northern Seven Years' War
Swedish courtiers
People of the War against Sigismund